Jennie Louise Ponsford  is an Australian neuroscience researcher at Monash University, 
Victoria who has a special interest in Traumatic Brain Injury (TBI).  Jennie is a clinical neuropsychologist, whose work is focused on developing a deeper understanding of the negative consequences of TBI, particularly those related to fatigue, sleep disturbance, attentional problems, mood and behavioural disturbances, and the development of rehabilitation interventions to improve long term recovery and quality of life in individuals with TBI.

Jennie is Director of the Monash-Epworth Rehabilitation Research Centre, the aim of which is to conduct research in trauma rehabilitation, with a view to reducing long-term disability. Over 20 psychologists and researchers are associated with the centre. Jennie is also a founding member of the Institute for Safety, Compensation and Recovery Research (established in 2009), a collaborative initiative of the Victorian WorkCover Authority, the Transport Accident Commission and Monash University, devoted to promoting research and best practice in injury prevention, rehabilitation and compensation. In partnership with the Department of Human Services, Jennie has created information resources for adults and children with mild traumatic brain injury.

Early life and education 
Jennie has completed a Bachelor of Arts, with honours in Psychology, a Masters in Clinical Neuropsychology and a PhD. She worked as a clinical neuropsychologist in Sydney before returning to Melbourne, taking up a position at the Epworth Hospital as Head of Psychology.  Jennie commenced work at Monash University in 1999. She established a doctoral program in neuropsychology at Monash University.  In 2000 she commenced as Director of the Monash-Epworth Rehabilitation Research Centre.

Work 
Professor Jennie Ponsford has spent the last 42 years working the field of traumatic brain injury. She currently co-ordinates one of the world’s largest longitudinal outcome studies, which is tracking more than 3000 patients over 30 years following a traumatic brain injury.  The Longitudinal Head Injury Outcome Project, has been running since 1995. The goal of the study is to document the long term problems of people with TBI, identify factors that influence outcome, particularly the influence of age, genetic, cultural and behavioural factors. This study represents one of the largest TBI databases with long term follow up data from both patients and families. Jennie has published widely in the field of TBI, writing over 20 book chapters addressing the consequences and management of TBI related disorders. In 2012 she was lead author on the book 'Traumatic Brain Injury Rehabilitation for everyday adaptive living' She has published over 400 scholarly articles on the topic.

Jennie was a Chief Investigator on the National Health and Medical Research Council  (NHMRC)-funded Centre of Research Excellence in Traumatic Brain Injury Psychosocial Rehabilitation, Moving Ahead. This Centre brought together researchers from within Australia and internationally to build research capacity in the area of TBI, drive new research and translate evidence into practice.

Personal 
Jennie is married with two daughters, Alice and Isabelle Targett. They are both incredibly proud of her.

Awards and honors 
 Robert L. Moody Prize (2013) for Distinguished Initiatives in Brain Injury Research and Rehabilitation
 President of the International Neuropsychological Society (2013-2014)
 Her student, Kelly Sinclair, was awarded the World Federation of NeuroRehabilitation Franz Gertenbrand Award for 2014 in recognition of research benefiting patients, for her work examining the potential effect of light therapy on depression in people with TBI.
 In 2017 she was made an Officer of the Order of Australia (AO) for distinguished service to medical research in the field of neuropsychology, and through seminal advances in the diagnosis, treatment and rehabilitation of patients with traumatic brain injuries.

References 

Australian Women of Neuroscience 2014
Australian neuroscientists
Australian women neuroscientists
Living people
Academic staff of Monash University
Officers of the Order of Australia
Year of birth missing (living people)